Halloy may refer to:

 Jean Baptiste Julien d'Omalius d'Halloy (1783-1875), Belgian geologist
 Halloy, Oise, a French commune
 Halloy, Pas-de-Calais, a French commune
 Château de Halloy, a castle in Halloy, Belgium
 Halloy, Belgium, a village in Belgium

See also
 Halloy-lès-Pernois, Somme, a French commune